The 2017 Missouri Valley Conference men's soccer season was the 27th season of men's varsity soccer in the conference.

The Loyola Ramblers were the defending regular season champions, while the SIU Edwardsville Cougars (now in the Mid-American Conference) were the 2016 tournament champions.

With the results of the games of Saturday, October 28, Missouri State secured the top seed in the MVC Tournament with Central Arkansas seeded second. MoSt then won the regular season title with a draw at Drake on November 4.

On Sunday, November 12, the Central Arkansas Bears defeated the Missouri State Bears 1–0 in overtime at Shea Stadium in Peoria, Illinois to with their first MVC Championship and advance to their first NCAA tournament since moving to Division I in 2007.

Changes from 2016
The Valparaiso Crusaders joined the MVC on July 1 after spending the past ten years in the Horizon League. At the time, Valpo became the eighth team in MVC men's soccer.

The MVC lost SIU Edwardsville (SIUE) to the Mid-American Conference, returning the MVC to seven men's soccer teams. The Cougars had initially been announced as joining MAC men's soccer in 2018, but less than a week after the initial announcement, the MAC indicated that SIUE men's soccer would instead join in 2017.

Teams

Season outlook 
2017 Preseason MVC Coaches' Poll

2017 Preseason MVC All-Conference Team'

† = Also on 2016 Preseason MVC All-Conference Team

Regular season

Rankings

United Soccer Coaches National Poll
Source =

West Region rankings
Source =

NCAA RPI
Source =

MVC Players of the Week

Postseason

MVC Tournament 

The 2017 MVC Tournament was played November 7, 8, 10, and 12 at Bradley University's Shea Stadium in Peoria, Illinois.

Second seeded Central Arkansas defeated top-seeded Missouri State 1–0 in overtime to earn the MVC's automatic bid to the NCAA tournament.

NCAA tournament

2018 MLS SuperDraft

Honors

2017 United Soccer Coaches NCAA Division I Men's All-West Region teams
Source:

2017 CoSIDA Academic All-America teams
Source: 

The six athletes named Academic All-Americans from the Missouri Valley Conference was the most from any of the 24 soccer playing conferences; the twelve team Atlantic Coast Conference was second with five members.

First team
Clark Emerson. Bradley University, 4.00, Business (Finance)

Second team
Aleksi Tuominen, Drake University, 4.00, Health Sciences

Third team
Liam Priestley, Missouri State University, 3.52, Finance

Kyle Hiebert, Missouri State University, 4.00, Accounting

Chris Holmes, University of Central Arkansas, 4.00, Health Services Administration

Ryan Merideth. Drake University. 3.86. Biochemistry & Molecular Biology

2017 CoSIDA Academic All-District teams
Source: 

Only All-District players are eligible for the Academic All-America ballot.

District 5 (IL, IN, MI, OH) 
Clark Emerson. Bradley University, 4.00, Business (Finance)

District 6 (AR, IA, LA, MN, MO, MS, ND, SD, WI) 
Liam Priestley, Missouri State University, 3.52, Finance

Kyle Hiebert, Missouri State University, 4.00, Accounting

Daltyn Knutson, University of Central Arkansas, 3.95, Finance

Aleksi Tuominen, Drake University, 4.00, Health Sciences

Chris Holmes, University of Central Arkansas, 4.00, Health Services Administration

Ryan Merideth. Drake University. 3.86. Biochemistry & Molecular Biology

2017 NSCAA NCAA Division I Men's Scholar All-America teams
Source:

NSCAA 2017-18 College Team Academic Award
Source:

The National Soccer Coaches Association of America (NSCAA) annually recognizes college and high school soccer programs that have excelled in the classroom by posting a team grade point average of 3.0 or higher. — of the MVC's seven teams were honored this year. The schools, their head coaches, and their team GPAs are:

—TBA—

2017 MVC awards
Source=

2017 MVC All-Conference First Team

 %First-team selection in 2016; $Second-team selection in 2016; #HM selection in 2016; *Second-team selection in 2015; +HM selection in 2015; ! Second-team selection in 2014

2017 MVC All-Conference Second Team

 #HM selection in 2016; *Second-team selection in 2015; +HM selection in 2015

2017 MVC All-Tournament Team
Source= 

2017 Missouri Valley Conference Men's Soccer Tournament MVP–Niklas Brodacki, Central Arkansas

2017 MVC Men's Soccer Scholar-Athlete teams
Source=

The criteria for the All-MVC honor parallels the CoSIDA (College Sports Information Directors of America) standards for Academic All-America voting. Nominees must be starters or important reserves with at least a 3.20 cumulative grade-point average (on a 4.00 scale). Also, students must have participated in at least 75 percent of the regular-season matches or played in the league tournament. Student-athletes must have reached sophomore athletic and academic standing at their institution (true freshmen and redshirt freshmen are not eligible) and must have completed at least one full academic year at their institution.

 @ = First Team in 2016; %  = Honorable Mention in 2016; # = First Team in 2015

See also 
 2017 NCAA Division I men's soccer season

References

 
2017 NCAA Division I men's soccer season